Norrbottensteatern (The Norrbotten Theater), is a Swedish regional theater company located in Luleå.

The theater company 
The company was formed in 1967, and was the first Swedish theater company with a regional mission. It has as its duties to play theater to adults and children in Luleå and the 13 municipalities of the Norrbotten county.
The theater is funded by the Luleå municipality and is run as a foundation.

The theater house 
The theater house was built in 1986, and is situated in the northern harbor in Luleå. The house is built as three wooden houses linked together, and mimics the boathouses that was situated in the harbour prior to the theater. A fourth house holds the regional dance centre, and the fifth the Luleå theater academy. The house holds three stages.

External links
 

Theatre companies in Sweden
Norrbotten
Buildings and structures in Norrbotten County